The first house of Orange is a Burgundian royal house that appears in the second half of the first century, and seems to have originated from the Viscounts of Nice. They ruled the County of Orange located in southern France from 885-1150. The house was succeeded by the House of Baux due to a lack of male heirs

History 
In the tenth century, Guillaume the Liberator after defeating the Moors at the battle of Tourtour, distributed the reconquered lands terra nullius to his fellow soldiers and vassals. The Nice region returns to Annon then by to descendants who take the title of Viscount of Nice.

The county of Orange was acquired gradually around 1070 by Bertrand-Raimbaud d'Orange through his two marriages.

In Gréolières Rostaing, baron of Gréolières-Vence, built the castle of Gréolières, which is mentioned as early as 1079. This castle replaced the Bau de Saint Jean, called Marjone, facing the hamlet of Saint-Pons, built in 1047.

Weakened over the generations by the rule of indivision of the possessions, the eviction of the family of Nice is done successively in 1108 and 1117 to the benefit of the Bishopric of Nice. In 1108, the descendants of Raimbaud de Nice authorized the canons of Nice to acquire by gift or purchase the "honores" of their men. Nine years later, Jausserand-Laugier of the Gréolières branch sold half of his possessions in Nice to Bishop Pierre and the canons, the other half being left after his death.

In 1152, Laugier de Gréolières paid homage to the bishop of Nice. Thus in a little less than half a century, the bishops Pierre and Arnaud thus succeeded in eliminating from eastern Provence the descendants of Odile or, at least, in subjecting them to their authority. In 1155 Prince William of Baux, son of Tibors de Sarenom heiress of the First House of Orange and  succeeded as Count of Orange, and was promoted to Prince of Orange in 1163 by Frederick Barbarossa, leading to the establishment of the House of Baux-Orange as Princes of Orange. Around 1230, Count Raimond Bérenger IV of Provence undertook the control of the upper Loup valley and to chew up the local nobility. The domains of Vence and Gréolières are conquered by Romée de Villeneuve around 1229, and in 1235 Raimond Bérenger IV consecrates him first baron of Vence. The fief remained in the family of Villeneuve, barons of Vence, until the Revolution

Genealogy 
Sources:

Nice branch

Branch of Vence

References

External links 
 Birth and affirmation of the Consulate of Nice
 The origins of the Mévouillon family 

Lists of nobility
History of Nice